Natalie Suzanne Canerday (born March 9, 1962) is an American actress.

Canerday is a native of Russellville, Arkansas. After earning a Bachelor of Arts degree in Theatre in 1985 from Hendrix College  (where she performed in plays with Herman's Head star William Ragsdale), she began her motion picture career as a production secretary for the television feature The Tuskegee Airmen, then made minor appearances in films such as Biloxi Blues and Walk the Line, and later Shotgun Stories. She played the wife of a small town sheriff in the 1991 film One False Move. Her most famous roles have been as protagonists' harried mothers in Sling Blade and October Sky. In 1996, she and others in Billy Bob Thornton's Sling Blade cast were collectively nominated for the Screen Actors Guild Award for Best Cast in a Motion Picture.

Canerday served as a judge for the 2006 George Lindsey/UNA Film Festival, and in 2007 was cast in a national radio commercial.
In October 2009 she worked in the Oak Ridge Secret City Film Festival  which was known as the 7 day shoot-out because the contestants had only 7 days to make a 2–7 minute short-film. She played the part of a bartender in the short film Third Rate Romance directed by Chase Hartsook.

References

External links
 
 Natalie Canerday at Moviefone

1962 births
Actresses from Arkansas
American film actresses
American television actresses
Living people
People from Russellville, Arkansas
Hendrix College alumni
People from Pope County, Arkansas
21st-century American women